The List of windmills is a link page for any windmill or windpump.

Africa

South Africa
See List of windmills in South Africa

Asia

Indonesia
[To be edited down]

The Dutch colonists in Batavia built at least four wind-powered sawmills around the Bay of Batavia, many years after founding Batavia (now Jakarta) in 1619, but these were not entirely successful.  People and animals (water buffalo) powered mills also and previously (introduced by the Chinese).  Out of about 25 Dutch-designed mills in the area, their water-powered mills were the most successful. Specifically, around 1675 a first wind-powered sawmill was built on the island of De Kuyper (now Pulu Burung) to support the Onrust Island (Pulu Kapal) dockyard that repaired  Dutch East India Company ships.  By 1685 there were two built in Onrust and around 1705 another was built on the island of Edam (Pulu Damar.

[Also or instead insert historic image, not yet uploaded to Commons, described by boomgaard as: "Figure 1 Two windmills were constructed by the VOC shortly after 1685 on the tiny island of Onrust, now called Pulu Kapal; both were sawmills working for the dockyard on the island. Engraving (dated 1714) taken from De Bruin, Reizen over Moskovie, 396 (Courtesy KITLV, Leiden)."]

All four were destroyed by British bombardment on 9 November 1800.  Under Napoleon, the Dutch nation which was named the Batavian Republic from 17xx to 18xx) had become part of the French empire, and Batavia in the East Indies was included. The bombardment was near the end of the War of the Second Coalition that pitted Britain and almost all of Europe against the First French Republic. [Though War of the Second Coalition doesn't mention it.]  This must have been part of the East Indies theatre of the French Revolutionary Wars [but that wikipedia article does not mention it. Nor does Campaigns of 1800 in the French Revolutionary Wars. ]

[Perhaps reduce down to not much more than an image and "the Dutch built four wind-powered sawmills on islands in the Bay of Batavia to support the Dutch East India Company's shipyard at Onrust, between 1665 and 1706.  These were destroyed by British bombardment in 1800, when the Netherlands were part of the French empire, towards the end of the the second Napoleonic War(?) " ]

Israel
See List of windmills in Israel

Japan

Syria

Taiwan

Thailand

Oceania

Australia 
 See List of windmills in Australia

New Zealand

Europe

Austria

Belarus

Belgium
See List of windmills in Belgium

Bulgaria

Czech Republic
See List of windmills in the Czech Republic

Denmark
See List of windmills in Denmark

Estonia
See List of windmills in Estonia

Finland

France 
See List of windmills in France

Germany
See List of windmills in Germany

Greece
See List of windmills in Greece

Hungary

Ireland
See List of windmills in Ireland

Italy

Latvia

Lithuania

Malta
See List of windmills in Malta

Netherlands 
 See List of windmills in the Netherlands

Virtually every small town and polder in the Netherlands has one or more windmills. The Zaanstreek alone has had over a thousand industrial windmills, each with a name and well-documented history (see list of windmills at Zaanse Schans). Other well-known windmills are the windmills at Kinderdijk.

Poland
See List of windmills in Poland

Portugal
See List of windmills in Portugal

Romania

Russia

Slovakia

Spain
See List of windmills in Spain

Sweden
See List of windmills in Sweden

Turkey

Ukraine

United Kingdom
See List of windmills in the United Kingdom

Channel Islands
See Windmills in Guernsey and Windmills in Jersey

Isle of Man
See Windmills in the Isle of Man

North America

Antigua

Barbados

Canada
See List of windmills in Canada

Guadeloupe

Saint Kitts and Nevis

United States 
See List of windmills in the United States

In the United States, there are some traditional windmills, but the American usage of the word "windmill" includes some that are actually windpumps.

South America

Brazil

Uruguay

References

See also
 
 Windpump
 Watermill
 Horse mill
 Moulin Rouge